How Men Are is the third studio album by English synth-pop band Heaven 17, released on 24 September 1984 by Virgin Records. The album peaked at No. 12 in the UK and was certified Silver (60,000 copies sold) by the BPI in October 1984.

Three singles were released from this album: "Sunset Now" (UK #24), "This Is Mine" (UK #23) in 1984, and an edited remix of "...(And That's No Lie)" (UK #52) in early 1985, which was the first Heaven 17 single to fail to reach the UK Top 40 since "Let Me Go" at the end of 1982.

Although digital sample-based instruments such as the Fairlight CMI and the LinnDrum drum machine were still responsible for most of the album's sounds, How Men Are marked the beginning of an increased usage of acoustic instruments in Heaven 17's music.  A small orchestra is employed on three tracks, and two tracks make use of the Phenix Horns Esquire, Earth, Wind & Fire's famous brass section. Another notable contribution to this album was made by the vocal group Afrodiziak, who sang on four tracks.

In 2006, Heaven 17's first three albums were remastered and reissued with bonus tracks.

Track listing
All songs written and composed by Glenn Gregory, Ian Craig Marsh, and Martyn Ware, except where noted.

Side one
 "Five Minutes to Midnight" – 3:46
 "Sunset Now" – 3:35
 "This Is Mine" – 3:51
 "The Fuse" – 3:05
 "Shame Is on the Rocks" – 3:59

Side two
"The Skin I'm In" – 3:46
 "Flamedown" – 2:59
 "Reputation" (John Wilson, Glenn Gregory, Ian Craig Marsh, Martyn Ware) – 3:03
 "And That's No Lie" – 10:02
Additional tracks
{| class="collapsible collapsed" border="0" style="margin-right:10.45em"
! style="width:100%; text-align:left;" | 2006 remastered CD bonus tracks
! |
|-
| colspan="2" |
 "This Is Mine (Cinemix)" – 8:43
"...(And That's No Lie) (Re-mixed to Enhance Danceability)" – 6:17
"Counterforce II" – 3:08
"Sunset Now (Extended Version)" – 5:21

All bonus tracks originally appeared on various formats of the singles taken from the album and had never appeared on CD before. "Counterforce II" was originally a B-side from the "Sunset Now" 12-inch single, and was also released under the title "Chase Runner" on the Electric Dreams soundtrack.
|}

Personnel
Heaven 17
 Glenn Gregory – lead and backing vocals
 Martyn Ware – LinnDrum programming, backing vocals, Roland System 100 bass (3)
 Ian Craig Marsh – Fairlight CMI programming, backing vocals (1), Roland System 100 (3, 6)

Session musicians
 Greg Walsh – Fairlight CMI programming, Roland System 100 bass (3)
 Nick Plytas – Roland System 100 simulated classical guitar (6), acoustic piano (8, 9)
 Ray Russell – guitars (5, 7, 9)
 John Wilson – guitars (8), bass guitar (9)
 Mo Foster – fretless bass (6)
 Phenix Horns Esquire – horns (3, 7)
 Michael Harris – flugelhorn (3)
 David Cullen – orchestral arrangements and conductor (1, 6, 9)
 Afrodiziak – backing vocals (2, 4, 8, 9)

Production
 B.E.F. – producers
 Greg Walsh – producer, engineer
 Jeremy Allom – engineer
 Ray Smith – cover paintings, photography, cover concept

Charts

Certifications

References

External links
 

1984 albums
Heaven 17 albums
Virgin Records albums